Babalola is a Nigerian name of Yoruba origin meaning "Father is Wealth." that may refer to:

Afe Babalola (born 1929), Nigerian lawyer
Afe Babalola University founded by Afe Babalola
Akin Babalola Kamar Odunsi, Nigerian businessman and politician
Andrew Babalola (born 1961), Nigerian politician
Babalola B J, Nigerian Metallurgical and Materials Engineer
Babalola Borishade (born 1946), Nigerian politician
Babalola Chinedum Peace, Nigerian pharmacist
Charles Babalola (born 1990), British actor
Gideon Babalola (born 1994), Nigerian badminton player
Isaac Babalola Akinyele (1882–1964), Nigerian royalty
Joseph Ayo Babalola (1904–1959), founder of the Christ Apostolic Church in Nigeria
Joseph Ayo Babalola University 
Lekan Babalola (born ), Nigerian jazz percussionist and musician
Oladipupo Babalola (born 1968), Nigerian football player
Olu Babalola (born 1981), British basketball player 
Remi Babalola, Nigerian minister and banker
Rilwan Lanre Babalola (born 1968), Nigerian minister and energy economist 
Solomon Babalola (1926–2008), Nigerian poet and scholar
Solomon Adeniyi Babalola (1929–2021), Veteran Nigerian Baptist Missionary/Evangelist, Church Pastor, Church Administrator, Denominational Leader, and Theological Educator
Taye Babalola (born 1991), Nigerian football player

References

Yoruba given names
Yoruba-language surnames